Ricordea is genus of corals. It is the only genus in the monotypic family Ricordeidae.

Species 
The following species are recognized in the genus Ricordea:

 Ricordea florida Duchassaing & Michelotti, 1860
 Ricordea yuma  (Carlgren, 1900)

References 

Ricordeidae
Hexacorallia genera